Eriocapitella vitifolia, a species of flowering plant in the buttercup family Ranunculaceae, is native to Asia. The specific epithet vitifolia means "vine-leaved, with leaves resembling those of Vitis", the genus of grapevines, and so the plant is commonly called the grape-leaved anemone or grape-leaved windflower. In Chinese, a common name is ye mian hua, which means "wild cotton".

Taxonomy

Eriocapitella vitifolia was described by Takenoshin Nakai in 1941. Like other members of genus Eriocapitella, E. vitifolia was formerly a member of genus Anemone. The basionym Anemone vitifolia Buch.-Ham. ex DC. was described in 1817.

Along with E. japonica, E. vitifolia is a parent of the hybrid E. × hybrida.

Ecology

Eriocapitella vitifolia along with four other taxa (E. hupehensis, E. japonica, E. tomentosa, and E. × hybrida) are known as fall-blooming anemones. In its native habitat, E. vitifolia flowers from July to October.

Bibliography

References

External links

 

vitifolia
Flora of Asia
Plants described in 1941
Taxa named by Takenoshin Nakai